Zeeshan Mushtaq (born 1 October 1989) is a Pakistani cricketer. He played in 47 first-class and 30 List A matches between 2007 and 2016.

References

External links
 

1989 births
Living people
Pakistani cricketers
Islamabad cricketers
Khan Research Laboratories cricketers
Pakistan Television cricketers
Sui Southern Gas Company cricketers
People from Gujrat, Pakistan
Sialkot cricketers